Hydrodynastes bicinctus, also known as the Herrmann's water snake, is a snake of the colubrid family. It is found in Guyana, Suriname, French Guiana, Brazil, Colombia, and Venezuela.

References

Hydrodynastes
Snakes of South America
Reptiles of Guyana
Reptiles of Suriname
Reptiles of French Guiana
Reptiles of Brazil
Reptiles of Colombia
Reptiles of Venezuela
Taxa named by Johann Hermann
Reptiles described in 1804